PWL (now Pete Waterman Entertainment) is a record label.

PWL may also refer to:

Preemptive wear leveling, a storage strategy used on hard disks
the abbreviation for piecewise linear
Pwllheli railway station, Gwynedd, Wales (National Rail station code)
Wirasaba Airport (IATA code)